The genus Amanita contains about 600 species of agarics, including some of the most toxic known mushrooms found worldwide, as well as some well-regarded edible species. This genus is responsible for approximately 95% of the fatalities resulting from mushroom poisoning, with the death cap accounting for about 50% on its own. The most potent toxin present in these mushrooms is α-Amanitin.

The genus also contains many edible mushrooms, but mycologists discourage mushroom hunters, other than experts, from selecting any of these for human consumption. Nonetheless, in some cultures, the larger local edible species of Amanita are mainstays of the markets in the local growing season. Samples of this are Amanita zambiana and other fleshy species in central Africa, A. basii and similar species in Mexico, A. caesarea and the "Blusher" Amanita rubescens in Europe, and A. chepangiana in South-East Asia. Other species are used for colouring sauces, such as the red A. jacksonii, with a range from eastern Canada to eastern Mexico.

Many species are of unknown edibility.  As of 2020, Amanita galactica is the last known species in its family.

Taxonomy
The name is possibly derived from Amanus, a mountain in Cilicia or from Amantia (Greek: Ἀμάντια, Ἀβάντια; Latin: Amantia), an ancient city in the transboundary region between Epirus or southern Illyria in antiquity.

The genus Amanita was first published with its current meaning by Christian Hendrik Persoon in 1797. Under the International Code of Botanical Nomenclature, Persoon's concept of Amanita, with Amanita muscaria (L.) Pers. as the type species, has been officially conserved against the older Amanita Boehm (1760), which is considered a synonym of Agaricus L.

Toxicity

Several members of the section Phalloidieae are notable for their toxicity, containing toxins known as amatoxins, which can cause liver failure and death. These include the death cap A. phalloides; species known as destroying angels, including A. virosa, A. bisporigera and A. ocreata; and the fool's mushroom, A. verna.

More recently, a series in the subgenus Lepidella has been found to cause acute kidney failure, including A. smithiana of northwestern North America, A. pseudoporphyria of Japan, and A. proxima of southern Europe.

Edibility

Although many species of Amanita are edible, including all of sect. Caesareae and sect. Vaginatae (together comprising hundreds of species), many fungi experts advise against eating a member of Amanita unless the species is known with absolute certainty. Because so many species within this genus are so deadly toxic, if a specimen is identified incorrectly, consumption may cause extreme sickness and possibly death.

Edible
Edible species of Amanita include Amanita fulva, Amanita vaginata (grisette), Amanita calyptrata (coccoli), Amanita crocea, Amanita rubescens (blusher), Amanita caesarea (Caesar's mushroom), and Amanita jacksonii (American Caesar's mushroom).

Inedible
Inedible species of Amanita include Amanita albocreata (ringless panther), Amanita atkinsoniana, Amanita citrina (false death cap), Amanita excelsa, Amanita flavorubescens, Amanita franchetii, Amanita longipes, Amanita onusta, Amanita rhopalopus, Amanita silvicola, Amanita sinicoflava, Amanita spreta, and Amanita volvata.

Poisonous species include Amanita brunnescens,, Amanita cokeri (Coker's amanita), Amanita crenulata, Amanita farinosa (eastern American floury amanita), Amanita frostiana, Amanita muscaria (fly agaric), Amanita pantherina (panther cap), and Amanita porphyria, but not Amanita ceciliae.

Deadly poisonous
Deadly poisonous species include Amanita abrupta, Amanita arocheae, Amanita bisporigera (eastern NA destroying angel), Amanita exitialis (Guangzhou destroying angel), Amanita magnivelaris, Amanita ocreata (western NA destroying angel), Amanita phalloides (death cap), Amanita proxima, Amanita smithiana, Amanita subjunquillea (East Asian death cap), Amanita verna (fool's mushroom), and Amanita virosa (European destroying angel).

Psychoactive species

Amanita muscaria 
Amanita muscaria was widely used as an entheogen by many of the indigenous peoples of Siberia. Its use was known among almost all of the Uralic-speaking peoples of western Siberia and the Paleosiberian-speaking peoples of the Russian Far East. There are only isolated reports of A. muscaria use among the Tungusic and Turkic peoples of central Siberia and it is believed that on the whole entheogenic use of A. muscaria was not practiced by these peoples.

Amanita pantherina 

Amanita pantherina contains the psychoactive compound muscimol, but is used as an entheogen much less often than its much more distinguishable relative A. muscaria.

Others 
Other species identified as containing psychoactive substances include:

 Amanita
 A. citrina
 A. gemmata
 A. pantherina var. abietum
 A. porphyria
 A. regalis
 A. strobiliformis
 Tricholoma
 Tricholoma muscarium

See also

 Death cap
 Destroying angel
 List of Amanita species

References

Sources

External links

 Rodham E. Tulloss and Zhu-liang Yang's Amanita site – Comprehensive listing of the nearly 600 named Amanita species with photos and/or technical details on over 510 species.
 "The genus Amanita" by Michael Kuo, MushroomExpert.Com, March 2005.

 
Agaricales genera
Hepatotoxins
Taxa described in 1794
Taxa named by Christiaan Hendrik Persoon